Patrick Neill Millsaps (born March 16, 1973) is the founder and CEO of Kane Studio, a film and television production studio in Georgia.  He is an American former attorney and film producer.

Early life and education
Millsaps was born in Knoxville, Tennessee and grew up in Cobb County, Georgia where he attended McEachern High School. He attended Samford University, initially to become a Southern Baptist preacher.  He graduated cum laude in 1995 with a degree in psychology. After graduating college, Millsaps worked for the Georgia Republican Party and then served as the political director for Johnny Isakson's first campaign for the U.S. Senate, which ended in a primary loss in 1996.

He enrolled in the University of Georgia School of Law in 1997. While still in law school, Millsaps served as the Policy Advisor to the Georgia State School Board and acted as the liaison between the Board Chairman Otis Brumby, then Georgia Governor Roy Barnes and then State School Superintendent Linda Schrenko. Millsaps obtained his Juris Doctor in 2000. After law school, he resumed a limited involvement in politics, organizing events and advising candidates for state and local offices.

Legal and political careers

Legal career
After passing the Georgia bar in 2000, he worked for criminal defense attorneys Ed Garland and Don Samuel during high-profile cases involving Ray Lewis, the Heritage High School shooting and the Gold Club trial. He continued his early legal career as a litigator and later practiced law with his mentor, Hylton B. Dupree, Jr.

In 2001, six months after he received his bar license, Millsaps filed the first lawsuit on behalf of a charter school against a school district in the state of Georgia. Millsaps represented Stone Mountain Charter School in a lawsuit against the DeKalb County school board over funding which the school claimed it should have and did not receive. The suit's premise was that the Dekalb school board was discriminating against the charter school and breaching the charter school contract by allotting less money per student than other schools in the district. The school board paid to settle the suit, though it denied any wrongdoing, citing the 1998 charter school law that did not provide guidelines for funding.

Millsaps founded his own law firm in 2004, which merged in 2011 with Hall Booth Smith where he was partner. Millsaps represented the Georgia Department of Community Health in 2008 as Special Counsel to Governor Sonny Perdue.  In 2010, Millsaps obtained a $1.5 million jury verdict for the family of a man that was killed by a drunk driver. This was one of the top jury verdicts in Georgia in 2010.

Presidential campaign
On December 26, 2011, Millsaps was contacted by Newt Gingrich's 2012 campaign for the Republican nomination for president to offer him a position as deputy general counsel—a volunteer position. Millsaps joined the campaign, his first involvement working in a presidential race, the week before the Iowa caucuses.

After a month working for the campaign, and orchestrating Gingrich's primary win in South Carolina, Gingrich promoted Millsaps to the position of chief of staff following the Florida primary and immediately made changes to reorganize the campaign's structure.

However, Millsaps quietly left the campaign at the end of March, 2012, when he learned that Campaign Manager Michael Krull, former advance man and college friend of Callista Gingrich's, and then longtime Gingrich staffer, Vince Haley, had run up $4.6 million of dollars of campaign debt, including reimbursements to young staffers, private security companies, vendors of all types and private jet charter companies that the campaign had no way of paying. Millsaps was one of the many people who was never paid for their work for the campaign.

Gingrich suspended his campaign for president on May 2, 2012.  As a result of this experience, Patrick has not been directly involved in political activity since.

Show business

Millsaps began his career in show business as a talent manager.  He then transitioned to film production. His first film as executive producer occurred by happenstance. A principal backer of the film, representing 20% of the budget, pulled out just 5 days before shooting was scheduled to begin. The producers of the film sought Millsaps' assistance and Millsaps was able to secure the required financing in less than a day. I'll see You In My Dreams starring Blythe Danner and  Sam Elliott was completed on a $1million budget, with a subsequent box office of more than $7million. The film premiered at the 2015 Sundance Film Festival.  The film was purchased for distribution by Bleecker Street and premiered in New York and Los Angeles on the weekend of May 15, 2015 to positive reviews. Millsaps was also executive producer on the film Wild Manand "Finding Noah" 

In December 2015, Millsaps founded Londonderry Entertainment, a talent management and production company.  The company was subsequently restructured, with  three subsidiaries, a film finance and production company, a television and digital media finance and production company, and a targeted film marketing company. Londonderry ceased operations in 2018.

In 2019, Millsaps founded Kane Studio, a real estate development company, to design and build a new production studio in Georgia. The Kane project will be located in an Opportunity Zone. The facility is expected to be operational in the Summer of 2022, and is projected to include a film and television production studio on a 1500 acre site, with more than 650,000 square feet of purpose built sound stages. 

Millsaps has also appeared on screen in several small parts. Those include uncredited parts in Road Trip and Courageous. In 2012, Millsaps received his first credited role, as District Attorney Denny Donaldson in the independent film Untouched.

Activism

In 2009, Georgia Governor Sonny Perdue signed the first tax incentive bill to encourage film and television production in the state of Georgia. By mid-2015 the legislation had generated over $6 billion in positive economic impact for the state. At the time the legislation was enacted, Governor Perdue credited Millsaps for his contribution to the effort, stating: "Patrick Millsaps understood early the benefits for Georgia aggressively pursuing the entertainment industry as an economic development project." "The combination of his business, political and legal skills were helpful in making tax credits a reality in Georgia."

In 2016, like many in the entertainment industry, Millsaps was a vocal critic of the Georgia General Assembly's so-called "Religious Liberty" bill, warning that passage would result in a Hollywood boycott negatively impacting the state economy. Under pressure from a chorus of detractors, Georgia Governor Nathan Deal vetoed the controversial piece of legislation.

Hollywood continued trying to exercise its economic clout to influence public policy in Georgia. When that failed, in 2019, there were calls for a boycott of filming in Georgia. Millsaps wrote a guest column for the Hollywood Reporter entitled, "There are better ways to protest than a boycott." The boycott movement failed to achieve traction.

Recognition
Millsaps has been called "one of the smartest, hard-working lawyers in the country". He has achieved an "AV-Preeminent" rating from Martindale-Hubbell. Millsaps was recognized by Georgia Trend Magazine as one of Georgia's best and brightest "40 under 40" in 2011. James Magazine has recognized him as one of the "Most Influential Georgians" every year since 2007, and one of "Georgia's Top Legal Leaders" in 2005 and 2006. The University of Georgia's Alumni Association recognized him as one of its 40 Under 40 in 2012. Atlanta Magazine recognized Millsaps as a "Rising Star" in 2010 and 2012. He was named one of as one of Southwest Georgia's "40 most influential people under the age of 40" by The Albany Herald in 2006.

In 2008, Millsaps was selected as one of 53 emerging American leaders representing 17 states and the District of Columbia to receive the Marshall Memorial Fellowship awarded through the German Marshall Fund.

Ariana Grande & Manchester Arena Bombing

In the wake of the May, 2017 bombing at an Ariana Grande concert in Manchester, England, Millsaps penned on open letter to Grande that went viral globally. After sharing the letter on Twitter, it has been viewed millions of times and shared over 100,000 times and liked by pop stars Taylor Swift, Miley Cyrus, Nicki Minaj and Grande herself.  Millsaps' letter received worldwide media attention and was covered by Mashable, the Today Show, BuzzFeed, BBC, Cosmopolitan, USA Today, MTV, the New York Daily News, Fox News, and thousands of other online, radio, print and television outlets.  In 2018, Millsaps' letter was published in a book entitled "Letters to Change the World: From Pankhurst to Orwell" by Travis Elborough.

References

External links 

 Kane Studio
 Television appearances
 

People from Knoxville, Tennessee
Living people
1973 births
Georgia (U.S. state) lawyers
Samford University alumni
University of Georgia alumni
University of Georgia School of Law alumni
Male actors from Georgia (U.S. state)
American political commentators
American film producers
American male non-fiction writers
American speechwriters